Onsted High School is a public high school in Onsted, Michigan.  It is the only high school in the Onsted Community School district.  Their nickname is the Wildcats.  They are members of the Lenawee County Athletic Association.

References

External links
 District Website

Schools in Lenawee County, Michigan
Public high schools in Michigan